Kim Seung-il (born 9 May 1985) is a South Korean gymnast. Kim was part of the South Korean team that won the bronze medal in the team event at the 2006 Asian Games. He competed for South Korea at the 2004, 2008 and 2012 Olympic Games.

References

1985 births
Living people
South Korean male artistic gymnasts
Gymnasts at the 2004 Summer Olympics
Gymnasts at the 2008 Summer Olympics
Gymnasts at the 2012 Summer Olympics
Olympic gymnasts of South Korea
Place of birth missing (living people)
Hanyang University alumni
Asian Games medalists in gymnastics
Gymnasts at the 2002 Asian Games
Gymnasts at the 2006 Asian Games
Asian Games gold medalists for South Korea
Asian Games silver medalists for South Korea
Asian Games bronze medalists for South Korea
Medalists at the 2002 Asian Games
Medalists at the 2006 Asian Games
21st-century South Korean people